The Duluth Civic Center Historic District is a historic government complex in Duluth, Minnesota, United States.  It includes the St. Louis County Courthouse, Duluth City Hall, and the Gerald W. Heaney Federal Building.  The complex was designed by urban planning pioneer Daniel Burnham in 1909 and constructed over the next twenty years.  It was listed as a historic district on the National Register of Historic Places in 1986 for its state-level significance in the themes of architecture and community planning and development.  It was nominated for its associations with Burnham and the City Beautiful movement.

The Duluth Civic Center Historic District comprises five contributing properties.  The Saint Louis County Courthouse, completed in 1909, was designed by Daniel Burnham & Co. as the focal point of the complex.  In front of it stands a monument to Duluth veterans who died in service overseas.  It was designed by Cass Gilbert and installed around 1921.  The St. Louis County Jail, designed by Holstead & Sullivan, was added in 1923.  Duluth City Hall was designed by the local architectural firm of Shefchik & Olsen and built in 1928.  The Federal Building was constructed in 1929.

A fountain was installed in front of the Soldiers and Sailors Monument in the late 1960s.  An act of Congress officially named the Federal Building for former District Court judge Gerald Heaney in 2007.

See also

 National Register of Historic Places listings in St. Louis County, Minnesota

References

1909 establishments in Minnesota
Buildings and structures in Duluth, Minnesota
County courthouses in Minnesota
Government buildings on the National Register of Historic Places in Minnesota
Historic districts on the National Register of Historic Places in Minnesota
National Register of Historic Places in St. Louis County, Minnesota
Neoclassical architecture in Minnesota
Renaissance Revival architecture in Minnesota